Wilson is the name of some places in the U.S. state of Wisconsin:
Wilson, Dunn County, Wisconsin, a town
Wilson, Eau Claire County, Wisconsin, a town
Wilson (community), Wisconsin, an unincorporated community
Wilson, Lincoln County, Wisconsin, a town
Wilson, Rusk County, Wisconsin, a town
Wilson, Sheboygan County, Wisconsin, a town
Wilson, St. Croix County, Wisconsin, a village

vo:Wilson (Wisconsin)